Rayna Popgeorgieva Futekova, better known as Rayna (aka Raika) Knyaginya (Райна Княгиня), aka "Queen of the Bulgarians" (Panagyurishte, Ottoman Empire, 6 January 1856  OS – Sofia, Kingdom of Bulgaria, 29 July  1917) was a Bulgarian teacher and revolutionary born in Panagyurishte who is famous for having sewn the flag of the April Uprising of 1876.

The flag and the uprising
When she was 20 and working as a head teacher in the Panagyurishte girls' school, she was asked to sew the flag for the April Uprising by Georgi Benkovski, which she accepted. The lion on the flag was drawn by Stoyan "Banenetsa" Karaleev after the pattern of the lion printed on the cover of the Bulgarian Revolutionary Central Committee's organization chart and the letters were drawn by Ivancho Zografa. Besides the Свобода или смърт (Svoboda ili smart, Freedom or death) inscription, the letters П and О (standing for Панагюрски окръг, the Panagyurishte revolutionary district) were added at the bottom.

On 22 April, the day of the flag's sanctification by priests from neighbouring villages, Rayna sewed tassels prepared during the night to it. The flag's size is 2 by 1.5 m, it has two sides and is hemmed by a strip of gold lace.

On the day the uprising was proclaimed, she waved the flag together with Georgi Benkovski. After it was brutally crushed by Ottoman troops, she was captured, then numerous times raped, molested, beaten and allowed only to eat bread and water  for more than a month in the Plovdiv prison.

For the commemoration of the uprising's 25th anniversary, Rayna Knyaginya prepared three copies of the original flag, two of them surviving until today and the other one being destroyed during the bombings of Sofia in World War II.

Later life
After her time in the prison, she managed to reach Moscow through Istanbul with a forged passport, where she studied medicine for three years and became a maternity nurse. There she wrote her autobiography, the first book about the uprising, that was first published in Russian and then translated into Bulgarian in 1934. While in Moscow, she managed to arrange the upbringing of 32 orphans from Panagyurishte, including her younger brother, through a ladies' charity committee.

Rayna Knyaginya was then invited by Kliment of Tarnovo to become a teacher in Tarnovo. She returned to Panagyurishte three years later to marry Vasil Dipchev, the mayor of the town. They moved to Plovdiv, where Dipchev, an extreme Russophile, was unable to find a job under the Russophobic government of Stefan Stambolov.

The two had five sons — Ivan, Georgi, Vladimir, Petar and Asen. Rayna also adopted a girl by the name of Gina. Vasil Dipchev was elected a deputy to the National Assembly of Bulgaria in 1888 and the family moved to Sofia. Dipchev died in 1898 as a consequence of the Black Mosque beatings that followed the assault on Stambolov, leaving Rayna with six children, the oldest of which was only 13 years old. She worked in the Sofia quarters of Orlandovtsi and Malashevtsi, maintaining strong ties with the family of Hristo Botev until her death on 29 July 1917, then 61 years old.

Honours
 Rayna Knyaginya Peak, a peak on Livingston Island in Antarctica is named after her.
 A Bulgarian postage stamp with her image was issued in 2017.

Notes

External links

 A collection of Bulgarian folk songs dedicated to Rayna Knyaginya at Liternet.bg (in Bulgarian)
 The descendants of Rayna Knyaginya (in Bulgarian)

1856 births
1917 deaths
People from Panagyurishte
Bulgarian revolutionaries
Bulgarian educators
April Uprising of 1876
19th-century Bulgarian people
19th-century Bulgarian women